Alicia Pérez Herranz, best known as Alicia Hermida (26 September 1932 – 9 February 2022) was a Spanish actress and acting teacher.

Life and career 
Alicia Pérez Herranz (her real name) was born in Madrid on 26 September 1932. She made her stage debut at the age of 13, and in the 1970s she formed her own theatrical company, La Barraca. In 1980 she founded an acting school, the Escuela Alicia Hermida ("Alicia Hermida School").

During her career Hermida was the recipient of several honors and accolades, including the 1998 Max Award for Best Supporting Actress for her role in Divinas palabras and a Lifetime Achievement Award by the Spanish Actors Union in 2017.

Beyond her career, she distinguished herself for strong left-leaning views and was a vocal supporter of the Cuban Revolution. She also ran as a candidate to the 2009 European Parliament election in Spain with the Iniciativa Internacionalista-La Solidaridad entre los Pueblos electoral list.

Hermida died on 9 February 2022, age 89, in the retirement home where she lived with her husband, the actor Jaime Losada.

References

External links 
 

1932 births
2022 deaths
Spanish film actresses
Spanish stage actresses
Spanish television actresses
Actors from Madrid
Acting teachers